Upper Batley is an area of Batley in West Yorkshire, England.
It was popular with the millowners of Batley in the 19th century as a place to build their family homes. There are many fine stone built villas in the area. Batley Hall, a two-storey oak-and-stone building,  was originally built in 1370 by William Copley, although the present building dates from 1857. Its gatehouses are now ordinary homes, and the Old Hall is now a residential home.  The 17th-century banqueting hall in the grounds is a grade II* listed building, whose origins may have been a dovecote or a private chapel built as early as 1465 for Lady Elizabeth Copley when rheumatism prevented her from travelling to the parish church in Batley for services. 
Upper Batley is also a conservation area.

See also
Listed buildings in Batley
Upper Batley High School

References

External links

Details of the conservation area
 Photos of Upper Batley on Geograph

Geography of Batley
Villages in West Yorkshire